is a junction and interchange railway station located in the city of Odawara, Kanagawa, Japan, operated jointly by the East Japan Railway Company (JR East) and Central Japan Railway Company (JR Tōkai). It is a gateway station to the Hakone area. It is also a freight depot for the Japan Freight Railway Company.

Lines 
Odawara Station is a station on the Tōkaidō Shinkansen with regional service provided by the Tōkaidō Main Line. It is located 83.9 kilometer from the terminus of these lines at Tokyo Station. Some trains of the Shōnan-Shinjuku Line also stop at Odawara. Local services are provided by the private railway companies Odakyu Electric Railway (Odawara Line), Izu-Hakone Railway (Daiyuzan Line) and the Hakone Tozan Railway (Hakone Tozan Line), for which Odawara is the terminus.

Station layout 
Odawara Station has a complex platform layout. The Tōkaidō Shinkansen has two elevated opposed side platforms. Tōkaidō Main Line and Shōnan-Shinjuku Line trains operated from two island platforms. The JR companies have staffed Midori no Madoguchi ticket offices and seat reservation counters. The Izu-Hakone Railway has two bay platforms. The Odakyu Electric Railway and Hakone Tozan Railway share two island platforms with a cutout arrangement.

Izu-Hakone Railway platforms

JR East platforms

Odakyu and Hakone Tozan platforms

JR Central platforms

History
What is now the JR East station opened on 21 October 1920.
 The Odakyu Electric Railway station opened on 1 April 1927.

Station numbering was introduced to the Odakyu Line in January 2014 with Odawara being assigned station number OH47.

Accidents
In April 2002, a person was hit and killed by a non-stop up train at the station after climbing down from the platform onto the shinkansen track.

In July 2007, a person was hit and killed by a non-stop train at the station after climbing down from the platform onto the shinkansen track.

In December 2008, a woman was hit and killed by a down non-stop train at the station after climbing down from the platform onto the shinkansen track.

In April 2009, a man was hit and killed by a down non-stop train at the station after climbing down from the platform onto the shinkansen track.

Passenger statistics
In fiscal 2019, the JR East station was used by an average of 33,460 passengers daily. The Shinkansen station was used by 11,245 passengers, the Odakyu station was used by 62,396 passengers, the Hakone Tozan portion of the station by 10,638 and the Izukyu portion by 8,773 passengers.

Surrounding area
 Odawara City Hall
 Odawara Castle

See also
 Odawara-juku
 List of railway stations in Japan

References

External links

 Odawara Station information (JR East) 
 Odawara Station Train Tracks (JR East)
Odawara Station information (JR Central) 
 Odawara Station information (Odakyu) 
 Odawara Station Map (Hakone Navi)
 Hakone Tozan Train information (Hakone Tozan Railway)
 Bus stop guide (Hakone Tozan Bus)
 Railway & Bus information (Izuhakone) 

Tōkaidō Shinkansen
Odakyu Odawara Line
Stations of Odakyu Electric Railway
Stations of Japan Freight Railway Company
Railway stations in Odawara
Tōkaidō Main Line
Railway stations in Japan opened in 1920